Thomas Duckett (October 23, 1924 – September 22, 2010) was an American politician. He served as a Democratic member for the 98th district of the Oklahoma House of Representatives.

Life and career 
Duckett was born in Stuttgart, Arkansas, the son of Mable Ann Henderson and Thomas Ross. He attended Konawa High School, Oklahoma State University–Stillwater and the University of Oklahoma.

Duckett became mayor of Mustang, Oklahoma for four terms. In 1973, he was elected to represent the 98th district of the Oklahoma House of Representatives, succeeding A. Visanio Johnson. He served until 1989, when he was succeeded by Tim Pope.

Duckett died in September 2010 in Independence, Missouri, at the age of 85.

References 

1924 births
2010 deaths
People from Stuttgart, Arkansas
Democratic Party members of the Oklahoma House of Representatives
20th-century American politicians
20th-century Members of the Oklahoma House of Representatives
University of Oklahoma alumni
Oklahoma State University alumni